Plestiodon barbouri, also known commonly as Barbour's blue-tailed skink and Barbour's eyelid skink, is a species of lizard in the family Scincidae. The species is endemic to Japan.

Etymology
The specific name, barbouri, is in honor of American herpetologist Thomas Barbour.

Geographic range
P. barbouri is found on the Amami Islands and the Ryukyu Islands of Japan.

Habitat
The preferred natural habitats of P. barbouri are forest and shrubland.

Reproduction
The mode of reproduction of P. barbouri is unknown.

References

Further reading
Schmitz A, Mausfeld P, Embert D (2004). "Molecular studies on the genus Eumeces Wiegmann 1834: phylogenetic relationships and taxonomic imlications". Hamadryad 28 (1–2): 73–89. (Plestiodon barbouri, new combination).
Van Denburgh J (1912). "Concerning Certain Species of Reptiles and Amphibians from China, Japan, the Loo Choo Islands, and Formosa". Proceedings of the California Academy of Sciences, Fourth Series 3: 187–257. (Eumeces barbouri, new species, pp. 215–216).

barbouri
Reptiles of Japan
Reptiles described in 1912
Taxa named by John Van Denburgh